Southeast Airlines was established in 1993 as Sun Jet International and was founded by Tom Kolfenbach.
It was a low fare public charter airline in the United States, headquartered in Largo, Florida, operating regular service to various vacation/leisure destinations using eight McDonnell Douglas DC-9-30 and two McDonnell Douglas MD-80 aircraft. It abruptly ceased operations on November 30, 2004. The airline was featured on The Simple Life reality TV series, which Southeast executives hoped would give the carrier some exposure.  The airline's jets featured the "Sun King" logo previously used by the original National Airlines which appeared on the tails of its aircraft.

The Southeast Airlines name was also used by another U.S. air carrier which was based in Miami and was operating scheduled passenger service in 1979 with jet aircraft nonstop between Miami and Aguadilla, Puerto Rico and also with turboprop aircraft nonstop between Miami and Tampa.

Destinations
Southeast Airlines served the following destinations throughout operations:
United States
Florida
Fort Lauderdale - Fort Lauderdale-Hollywood International Airport
Orlando - Orlando International Airport - Orlando Sanford International Airport 
St. Petersburg - St. Petersburg-Clearwater International Airport
Fort Walton Beach, Florida - Fort Walton Regional Airport
West Palm Beach - West Palm Beach International Airport
Fort Myers - Southwest Florida International Airport
Ohio
Columbus - Rickenbacker International Airport
Youngstown-Warren - Youngstown-Warren Regional Airport
Nevada
Las Vegas - McCarran International Airport
South Carolina
Myrtle Beach - Myrtle Beach International Airport
North Carolina
Wilmington - Wilmington International Airport - Charlotte, North Carolina - Raleigh-Durham International Airport - Morrisville, North Carolina
New York
Newburgh, near New York City - Stewart International Airport - LaGuardia Airport
Pennsylvania
Allentown - Lehigh Valley International Airport
Mississippi
Gulfport - Gulfport/Biloxi International Airport
Mexico
Cancun - Cancun International Airport

Fleet

Southeast Airlines operated the following aircraft throughout operations:

See also 
 List of defunct airlines of the United States

References

Airlines established in 1999
Airlines disestablished in 2004
Defunct airlines of the United States
1999 establishments in Florida